Romance Land is a 1923 American silent Western film directed by Edward Sedgwick and written by Joseph F. Poland. It is based on the story "The Gun-Fanner" by Kenneth Perkins, published in Argosy, June 10-July 1, 1922. The film stars Tom Mix, Barbara Bedford, Frank Brownlee, George Webb, Pat Chrisman, and Wynn Mace. The film was released on February 11, 1923, by Fox Film Corporation.

Plot
As described in a film magazine, Pep Hawkins (Mix) read his books and became enthused with the spirit of the heroic Walter Raleigh. He fancies himself as a Lancelot and dons a set of armor as he rides in the western plains. Nan Harvess (Bedford) also sought romance and one day she was rescued by this knight in armor who stopped her runaway team. Although her uncle had promised her hand in marriage to another, she loves Pep. The uncle decides to hold a tournament to settle the question with chariot races and other stunts, and the victor to receive Nan's hand in marriage. When Pep tries to register for the tournament, he is initially ineligible, but finally convinces them that he is. During the tournament the uncle resorts to foul play to rid himself of Pep, but Pep always stages a comeback and finally wins. The uncle is forced to keep his promise and, although he tries at the last minute to prevent the wedding, Pep heroically takes his bride away.

Cast        
 Tom Mix as 'Pep' Hawkins
 Barbara Bedford as Nan Harvess
 Frank Brownlee as 'Scrub' Hazen
 George Webb as Counterfeit Bill
 Pat Chrisman as White Eagle
 Wynn Mace as Sheriff

Preservation
A complete copy of Romance Land is held by a film archive.

References

External links
 
 

1923 films
1920s English-language films
1923 Western (genre) films
Fox Film films
Films based on novels
Films directed by Edward Sedgwick
American black-and-white films
Silent American Western (genre) films
Films with screenplays by Joseph F. Poland
1920s American films